[[File:Turner, Joseph Mallord William - The Goddess of Discord Choosing the Apple of Contention in the Garden of the Hesperides - c. 1806.jpg|thumb|right|240px|J. M. W. Turner, The Goddess of Discord Choosing the Apple of Contention in the Garden of the Hesperides]]

An apple of discord is the core, kernel, or crux of an argument, or a small matter that could lead to a bigger dispute.

It is a reference to the Golden Apple of Discord in the story of the Judgement of Paris which, according to Greek mythology, was what the goddess Eris ("Strife") tossed in the midst of the feast of the gods at the wedding of Peleus and Thetis as a prize of beauty, thus sparking a vanity-fueled dispute among Hera, Athena, and Aphrodite that eventually led to the Trojan War.

 Derivative uses 
Because of this, the Roman goddess corresponding to the Greek Eris was named "Discordia".

In the Eixample district of Barcelona, there is a block nicknamed in Spanish . The reason for this usage is that the word  means both "apple" and "city block" in Spanish. It was so named ("block of discord") because it features four different interpretations of Modernisme architecture: Antoni Gaudí's Casa Batlló, Lluís Domènech i Montaner's Casa Lleó Morera, Josep Puig i Cadafalch's Casa Amatller, and Enric Sagnier's Casa Mulleras.

 "To the Most Beautiful" 
In some later sources, Eris inscribed on the apple "for the fairest" or "to the most beautiful" before tossing it. In Latin sources, the word is ''.

See also 
Golden apple
Killing three warriors with two peaches

References

Eris (mythology)
Mythological food and drink
Mythological plants
Judgment of Paris
Apples in culture
Greek mythology